Taekwondo at the 2007 South Pacific Games in Apia, Samoa was held on 30 August to 1 September 2007. The taekwondo tournament was dominated by Francophone nations winning eleven of the thirteen events. Tahiti, New Caledonia, and Wallis and Futuna won six, four, and one gold medals respectively.

Medal overview

Men

Women

See also
 Taekwondo at the Pacific Games

References

External links 
Official Website

2007 in taekwondo
2007 in Oceanian sport
2007 South Pacific Games
2007 South Pacific Games